The Sakumo Ramsar Site also known as the Sakumo Lagoon is a wetland of international importance. Activities ongoing within the site include farming, fishing, recreation, urban and industrial development.

Ramsar Site 
Sakumo wetlands was proposed as a Ramsar Site in 1987. In 1992 it was gazetted as a Ramsar Site by which time about one third of the area originally proposed had been used for settlement development.

Lagoon 
The size of the open lagoon varies from  depending on the season. In the rainy season it expands and shrinks in the dry season. Large portions of the lagoon dry up in the dry season, resulting in hyper-saline conditions. The lagoon is separated from the sea by a narrow road, connecting Accra and Tema. A small permanent connection to the sea is established by an open sluice, constructed to prevent flooding of the coastal road in the past.

Flora 
The flood-plain is periodically inundated and the flooded areas are largely devoid of vegetation. There are also areas of freshwater marsh and coastal savanna grassland, the latter composed mainly of Sesuvium portulacastrum with various grass species associations. Land-use in the catchment includes rice, cassava, and vegetable cultivation.

Fauna

Fishes 

The lagoon has  surface area and defined as semi-closed because of its permanent, but limited interaction with the sea. Sixteen fish species or genera were found in the lagoon.

Four groups of fishes emerged: 

 Fresh water fishes occurring only during the rainy season (e.g. Clarias gariepinus)
 Permanent inhabitants of the lagoon (e.g. Sarotherodon melanotheron)
 Juvenile stages of marine fishes swimming into the lagoon after the rainy season (e.g. Mugil cephalus)
 Marine fishes coming for short incursions into the lagoon (e.g. Lutjanus fulgens)

The lagoon is heavily over-fished resulting in reduced catch over the years.

Avifauna 
Past records have registered over seventy waterbird species at the site with about 30,000 birds. The common species are Charadrius hiaticula, Chlidonias niger, Egretta garzetta, E. gularis, Sterna hirundo, S. sandvicensi and Tringa erythropus. Some breeding waterbirds include Glareola pratincola, Charadrius pecuarius and S. albifrons. The Black heron (E. ardesiaca) is considered sacred and protected by local taboos.

Marine Turtle 
Species of marine turtle that were previously recorded nesting on the beach are Lepidochelys olivacea, Chelonia mydas and Dermochelys coriacea.

Conservation Issues 

The area which was designated in 1992, currently has portions taken over by land developers (urban and industrial). The area has one of the highest urban growth-rates within the coastal zone. Sewage and domestic waste from the catchment, also threatens the lagoon. The spread of urbanization continues and if not stopped the entire catchment will be destroyed. The area has high educational and recreational value as one of the green areas left in the Accra-Tema Metropolitan Area. The lagoon is regarded as a fetish by the indigenous people of Tema, New Town.

During the dry season (August to March), a larger part of the lagoon dries up.  The area is encroached upon by cattle which graze in the dry season and land developers who build very close to the site which is a government properly and should not be used by any developer. There is a Biodiversity Conservation and Local Community Development Project to rehabilitate degraded areas and conserve the biodiversity within the Sakumo Ramsar Site.

Rehabilitation of site 

The Wildlife Division of the Forestry Commission is the government agency responsible for the area. The Environmental Protection Agency-Ghana and the United Nation Environment Programme initiated an afforestation project of planting trees in the wetland area using treated waste water as a way of reforesting and conserving the degraded areas.  Others are Sakumo Ramsar Conservation and Resource Users Association and the Friends of Ramsar Sites. The surrounding communities such as Klagon, Sakumono and Nungua are protecting the site.

References

Ramsar sites in Ghana
Lagoons of Ghana